Pseudoalteromonas paragorgicola is a marine bacterium isolated from a sponge in the Pacific Ocean.

References

External links
Type strain of Pseudoalteromonas paragorgicola at BacDive -  the Bacterial Diversity Metadatabase

Alteromonadales
Bacteria described in 2002